Pamela Potillo (born April 30, 1974 in Trenton, New Jersey) is an American actress. She is best known as Janet on The Cosby Show (1985-1990).

Career and Education
Raised in New Jersey, Potillo began her career as one of the hosts on the weekend morning kids' news magazine Wonderama, which ran on WNEW-TV. Her role on the show was produced from 1980 to 1987.

In 1984, Potillo made her Broadway debut as Georgia Jones in Shirley Lauro's Open Admissions. She is also known for her recurring role on The Cosby Show as Vanessa Huxtable's friend Janet Meiser from 1985 to 1990. Potillo also appeared with Ben Affleck and Madeline Kahn in an episode of the ABC Afterschool Special.

Potillo received her B.A. from Rutgers University and an M.A. from Pepperdine University.

Filmography

References

External links
 

1974 births
20th-century American actresses
21st-century American actresses
African-American actresses
American child actresses
American voice actresses
Hispanic and Latino American actresses
Living people
Actors from Trenton, New Jersey
Pepperdine University alumni
Rutgers University alumni
20th-century African-American women
20th-century African-American people
21st-century African-American women
21st-century African-American people